The 2020 COSAFA Women's Championship is the eighth edition of the COSAFA Women's Championship, a women's international football tournament for national teams organised by COSAFA, teams from Southern Africa. It takes place from 3 to 14 November in the Nelson Mandela Bay Metropolitan Municipality, South Africa.

Participants
Nine of the fourteen COSAFA member took take part in the competition.  Tanzania from the CECAFA region entered as guests. Eswatini and Lesotho entered late because of uncertainety due to the COVID-19 pandemic. Namibia withdrew on 21 October 2020. The draw then was held on 22 October 2020.

 (guest)

Squads

Venues

Group stage
The group stage is composed of three groups of four teams each. Group winners and the best runner-up amongst all groups advance to the semi-finals.  As Group A has 4 teams, the results against the bottom-placed team in this group are not counted towards the best runner-up calculation.

 All times are South African Standard Time (UTC+2).

Group A

Group B

Group C

Best runner-up

Knockout stage

Semi-finals

1.Group B winner was originally scheduled to play the best runner-up of the group stage. But the regulations of the tournament didn't allow two teams from the same group to play against each other in the Semi-finals, and therefore the games had to be changed.

Final

Goalscorers

References

External links
Official website

2019
2020 in African football
2020–21 in South African soccer
2020 in South African women's sport
2020 in women's association football
International association football competitions hosted by South Africa
November 2020 sports events in Africa